Tanja is a female given name

Tanja may also refer to:

Alternate name for Tangier, a Moroccan city
Alternate transliteration for danja , a Korean rice cake
Tanja Liedtke Foundation, German-based charity supporting modern and contemporary dance
Tanja (TV series), a 39-piece German ARD Art Series by Berengar Pfahl
Tanja sail, also known as the tilted square sail, used by native Austronesian ships in maritime Southeast Asia

See also 

Tania (disambiguation)
Tanya (disambiguation)
Tonja (name)
Tonya (disambiguation)
Tonia (disambiguation)